The 2004 World Group Play-offs decided which nations featured in World Group in the 2005 Fed Cup. The play-off winners went on to feature in World Group in 2005, while the losing nations joined Zonal Competition for 2005.

Thailand vs. Australia

Brazil vs. Croatia

Estonia vs. Czech Republic

Ukraine vs. Germany

Bulgaria vs. Japan

Slovakia vs. Belarus

Indonesia vs. Slovenia

Canada vs. Switzerland

References

See also
Fed Cup structure

World Group Play-offs